Leteći odred is Croatian pop band from the city of Osijek that used to be popular in the mid 1990s. Its name means "Flying Squad" in Croatian. They formed in 1991 with Denis Dumančić.

Their serious music career group began in 1992, when it was discovered by Husein Hasanefendić, known as Hus, a recognized and reputable author and leader of the Parni Valjak who along with Marijan Brkic-Brko stood behind the project and the ability to shoot and issuance of original songs by Denis Dumančić. The first inaugural album by Leteći Odred, titled "Među Zvijezdama" (Among the stars) was released in late 1992. Among the 10 or so  highly acclaimed songs were "Neka Neveni ne venu" (Don't let marigold wither) and "Kao stari  moj" (As my old man) that were well received by the audience and the media. In 1993, Leteći Odred performed at the first Croatian Eurovision i.e. "Crovizija" with the song "Cijeli je svijet zaljubljen" (The whole world is in love).

History

1994–1996: Beginnings 
In late 1994, Leteći Odred released an album, titled "Kada Odletim" (When I fly away) issued by the label "Orfej". Some of notable songs were "Ja se budim" (I'm waking up) and "U mojoj glavi ima sudara" (There's crashes in my head) and the song "Heroji ne plaču" (Heroes don't cry) written by Miroslav Škoro, and performed in duet.

In 1995, Leteći Odred performed at the Croatian Eurovision i.e. "Crovizija", with the song "Pišem ti pismo" (I'm writing you a letter).

1996-1999: Mainstream Success 
In 1996, Leteći Odred released their third album titled "Od Prevlake do Dunava" (From Prevlaka to Dunav). Songs like "Od Prevlake do Dunava" (From Prevlaka to Dunav), "Kao ja ne kužim" (Like I don't get it), "Teta" (Aunt), "Večeras je dušo rođendan tvoj" (Tonight is your birthday, Honey), "Uzalud je mjesečina" (Moonlight is in vain) and "A bez vina" (Without wine) became big hits. The album sold more than 20,000 copies and the band then started a major promotional tour in Croatia, Slovenia, Germany, Switzerland and Austria, as part of which held more than a hundred concerts and lasting for a year. Big concert in Dom sportova in Zagreb marked the end of tour, from where there is a videotape, "Zagreb za Valentinovo" (Zagreb for Valentine's Day).

In 1997 they released fourth album entitled "Kuda ide ovaj vlak" (Whither goes the train), where, among other songs are "Sanjao sam moju Ružicu" (I dreamed my Ružica), which even before the release of the album became a big hit and was ranked first in the nation's top charts for more than three months. "Hajde cigane" (Go gypsy) and "Lijepa je naša puna odlikaša" (Beautiful our land full of straight-A students) are also some of the most famous songs from the fourth album, which public and media particularly well received. That year, Leteci Odred went on the tour again, which included hundreds of concerts around the Croatian, Bosnia and Slovenia, and again sold-out concert at the Dom sportova for Valentine's Day in 1998. Album "Kuda ide ovaj vlak" (Whither goes the train) was sold by the end of 1998 to more than 30,000 copies and became the best selling album of Leteci Odred so far.

In 1998 due to a series of promotional and other obligations around music career Denis Dumančić moved with his family in Zagreb and began a collaboration with other artists and performers on the Croatian music scene.

In early 1999, the fifth album called "Vrijeme" (Time) for a new record label Dallas Records, which signed an exclusive contract. Album "Vrijeme" (Time) has reached a circulation of over 17,000 copies. A prominent songs from the album were "Priznajem" (I admit), "Zbog tebe oženiti se neću" (Because of you I won't get married), "Neka veselo je" (Let it be happily). The album immediately upon release by critics gets rated as definitely the most mature and best album of Leteći Odred.

Early 2000s 
In 2000, Leteći Odred announced new album with the song "Zao mi je" (I'm sorry) which was performed at the Croatian Radio Festival and became a big hit and the announcement of the sixth album entitled "Daj mi sebe" (Give me yourself). The song "Daj mi sebe" (Give me yourself) was remembered for extraordinary airplay, and becomes the third most performed song in 2001 on the basis of reported performance by Croatian radio and TV stations. Besides the title song, "Daj mi sebe" (Give me yourself), among other are "Zao mi je" (I'm sorry), "Vrištao bih cijele noći" (I'd scream all night long), "Hej lutkice" (Hey, baby) "Tebi mogu reći sve" (I can tell anything to you), and others that easily find their way to the hearts of listeners.

Group Leteći Odred has often held solo concerts to raise money to help and responded to every call of charities and organizations and participated in numerous charitable concerts and campaigns.

So for one of the biggest humanitarian actions "Dajmo da čuju" (Let them hear) under the auspices of the Croatian Caritas Denis Dumančić composed a song entitled "Od srca mog" (From my heart) performed by the Croatian band aid, where it participated twenty most famous local artists such as Oliver Dragojević, Doris Dragović, Zdenka Kovačićek, Gibonni, Severina, Colonia, Petar Grašo, Vesna Pisarović, Gazde, Magazin, Goran Karan, Jasmin Stavros, Ivana Banfić, Nina Badrić, Danijela Martinović, Jole, Mladen Bodalec i Aki Rahimovski.

In 2002, Leteći Odred started big birthday concert, again for Valentine's Day, in Zagreb's Dom sportova and celebrates 10 years of existence. That same year, Denis with his frequent collaborator on texts Faruk Buljubačić - Fayu composed song for the IDF "Ja sam mali Mate" (I'm little Mate) which Mali Mate and Leteći Odred represented the Croatian Radio Festival and won the hearts of audiences of all ages.

During 2002, the album titled "Uživo" (Live), which represented a complete cross-section of Leteći Odred career and brings greatest hits of Leteći Odred recorded live in Zagreb Dom sportova and a bonus track - a duet with Alka Vuica entitled "Hajde ne laži meni" (C'mon don't lie to me). It was the icing on the cake in celebration of the tenth anniversary of Leteći Odred, a band which live music and performances in the halls marked career.

In 2004, after almost four years since the last studio album, Leteći Odred is back with the seventh album titled "Razglednice" (Postcards) published by Dallas Records. Razglednice is an album that rolled squad back to the old, recognizable sound and songs like those that marked several generations of youth. On Razglednice is the song "Kažu" (They say), first hit single which occupied tops of radio charts for weeks, and the song "Šuti" (Hush) which introduced the Leteći Odred on Croatian radio festival. Very notable song from this album was the song "Šta je tu je" (It's what it is)  and the song "Jednu mladost imam" (I only have one youth) who at that time was recognized as the "anthem" of graduates.

It was the last album, attended by first lineup consisted of: Denis Dumančić - vocals, Allen Vekić - guitar, Hrvoje Hum - bass, Marian Kiss - keyboards and Damir Gleković-Taban - drums.

Comeback 
After more than three and half year break, Denis Dumančić gathers an impressive brand new opportunity for Leteći odred in cooperation with the publishing house Dancing Bear released the album "Jutro poslije brijanja" (Morning after seducing) that came to light in early July 2007. The new album announced singles: "Ljubav nije matematika" (Love is not math) and "Bez obaveza" (No Strings Attached).

In the pauses between tracks Denis Dumančić wrote songs for a number of famous artists from the Croatian music scene. Denis in recent years on the Croatian music scene imposed as one of the most performed authors on the basis of reports Croatian Composers Society and enjoys the status of artist recognized by the Croatian Ministry of Culture. In his musical accomplishments were many kind of songs so that in its author's oeuvre can be found children pop - rock songs to tambour, Dalmatian and entertaining songs. He has worked with many famous and renowned authors and performers of Croatian music scene. His songs can be found on the albums by Massimo, Željko Bebek, Boris Novković, Hari Mata Hari, Danijela Martinović, Ivana Banfić, Jasmin Stavros, Alka Vuica, Jole, Gazde, Crvena jabuka, Prva liga, Maja Šuput, Lea, Kemal Montena, Vinko Coce, Zlatko Pejaković  and many others.

Its 18th year on the Croatian music scene, the group celebrated by releasing their 11th album "Najbolje od odreda" (The Best of Odred) which came out with a slight delay in May 2011 by Dallas Records. On the double album it includes 35 most famous songs by Leteći odred selected with 10 studio albums the group released so far, and as a bonus there are two new songs; song "Studeni" (November) in which a guest joins Kristijan Kiki Rahimovski and song "Dok se kunes" (While you swear)

Twentieth anniversary of Leteći odred is marked with a big concert at the Tvornica kulture in Zagreb.

Present day 
Currently, Leteći odred is preparing a new album, whose release is expected in the fall of 2013. The album has already announced the singles "Studeni" (November), "Možeš ti sve što hoćeš" (You can do whatever you want), "Svaki dan je s tobom poseban" (Every day is special with you), "Ljubavi" (Love) and on it there will be a bonus song "Čini mi se brate" (It looks like so, brother) sung by three generations of musicians. Three different interpretations, godparents, Denis from Leteći odred and Bebek this song make especially interesting and radio phonic for the general population.

Discography 
1992: Među zvijezdama (Among the stars)
1994: Kada odletim (When I fly away)
1996: Od Prevlake do Dunava (From Prevlaka to Dunav)
1997: Kuda ide ovaj vlak (Whither goes the train)
1998: The Best of Letećeg odreda (The Best of Leteći Odred)
1999: Vrijeme (Time)
2001: Daj mi sebe (Give me yourself)
2002: Uživo Leteći odred (Leteći odred Live)
2004: Razglednice (Postcards)
2007: Jutro poslije brijanja (Morning after seducing)
2011: Najbolje od odreda (The Best of Odred)
2013: Agent za ljubav (Love agent)
2020: Uspomene (Memories)

References

External links

Croatian pop music groups
Musical groups established in 1991
1991 establishments in Croatia